A pelisse was originally a short fur-trimmed jacket which hussar light-cavalry soldiers from the 17th century onwards usually wore hanging loose over the left shoulder, ostensibly to prevent sword cuts. The name also came to refer to a fashionable style of woman's coat worn in the early-19th century.

Military uniform
The style of uniform incorporating the pelisse originated with the hussar mercenaries of Hungary in the 17th century. As this type of light cavalry unit became popular in Western Europe, so too did their dress. In the 19th century pelisses were in use throughout most armies in Europe, and even some in North and South America.

In appearance the pelisse was characteristically a very short and extremely tight fitting (when worn) jacket, the cuffs and collar of which were trimmed with fur. The jacket was further decorated with patterns sewn in bullion lace, often in a pattern matching that of the dolman worn beneath it. The front of the jacket was distinctive and typically featured several rows of parallel froggings and loops, and either three or five vertical lines of buttons. For officers of the British Hussars this frogging, regimentally differentiated, was generally of gold or silver bullion lace, to match either gold (gilt) or silver buttons. Other ranks had either yellow lace with brass buttons or white lace with "white-metal" (nickel) buttons. Lacing varied from unit to unit and country to country. It was held in place by a lanyard. In cold weather the pelisse could be worn over the dolman.

The prevalence of this style began to wane towards the end of the 19th century, but it was still in use by some cavalry regiments in the Imperial German, Russian and Austro-Hungarian armies up until World War I. In the Prussian Army the pelisse had been abolished in 1853 but between 1865 and 1913 it was reintroduced for ceremonial wear by nine hussar regiments and the Life-Guard Hussar Regiment, usually at the request of the regimental Colonel-in-Chief. The two hussar regiments of the Spanish Army retained pelisses until 1931. The Danish Garderhusarregimentet are  the only modern military unit to retain this distinctive item of dress, as part of their mounted full-dress uniform.

Ladies fashion

In early 19th-century Europe, when military clothing was often used as inspiration for fashionable ladies' garments, the term was applied to a woman's long, fitted coat with set-in sleeves and the then-fashionable Empire waist. Although initially these Regency-era pelisses copied the Hussars' fur and braid, they soon lost these initial associations, and in fact were often made entirely of silk and without fur at all. They did, however, tend to retain traces of their military inspiration with frog fastenings and braid trim.
Pelisses lost even this superficial resemblance to their origins as skirts and sleeves widened in the 1830s, and the increasingly enormous crinolines of the 1840s and '50s caused fashionable women to turn to loose mantles, cloaks, and shawls instead.

Depending on the season, the pelisse was made of cotton, silk, or wool and trimmed-usually on the collar, center front edges, cuffs, and hem – with fur, swansdown, lace, velvet, fringe, or silk plush.

See also
Redingote
Witzchoura

References

External links
 Coat (Pelisse), 1800-1815, in the Staten Island Historical Society Online Collections Database

17th-century fashion
18th-century fashion
19th-century fashion
20th-century fashion
Robes and cloaks
History of clothing (Western fashion)
Hungarian clothing
History of clothing
Military uniforms